Jaroslav Hainz (17 September 1883 – between 1914 and 1918) was a Czech tennis player. He competed for Bohemia in the men's indoor singles event at the 1912 Summer Olympics. He died during World War I.

See also
 List of Olympians killed in World War I

References

1883 births
1910s deaths
Year of death missing
Czechoslovak male tennis players
Olympic tennis players of Bohemia
Tennis players at the 1912 Summer Olympics
Tennis players from Prague
Austro-Hungarian military personnel killed in World War I
Sportspeople from the Austro-Hungarian Empire